La Guirlande merveilleuse, sold in the United States as The Marvellous Wreath and in Britain as The Marvellous Hoop, is a 1903 French short silent film by Georges Méliès. It was sold by Méliès's Star Film Company and is numbered 445–448 in its catalogues.

Méliès plays the musketeer in the film, the main special effect of which is a closeup superimposed into a circular opening by multiple exposure; Méliès used a similar effect in Alcofrisbas, the Master Magician later that year. Other special effects in The Marvellous Wreath are worked using pyrotechnics, substitution splices, and dissolves.

References

External links
 

French black-and-white films
Films directed by Georges Méliès
French silent short films
1900s French films